Paintbrush is a raster image editor for Mac OS X. It aims to replace MacPaint, an image editor for the classic Mac OS last released in 1988. It also is an alternative to MS Paint. It has basic raster image editing capabilities and a simple interface designed for ease of use. It exports as PNG, JPG, BMP, GIF, and TIFF. The application also is often used for pixel art because of its grid option, and is not made for large scale images or GIMP or Photoshop-like editing on pictures or photographs.

Features and capabilities
It includes a simple brush-based freehand drawing tool, an eraser tool, a select tool, a freehand spray can tool which applies several pixels onto an area instead of just one, a fill tool, a "bomb" tool that clears the page, a line tool, a curve tool, square, circle/oval, and rounded square tools, text tool, a color picker/eyedropper, and a zoom in/zoom out tool. Zooming in will go up to 1600%, while zooming out will only go up to 25%. There are adjustable stroke sizes which pertain to the brush, eraser, and spray can tools. Stroke size 1 has a width of 1 pixel, and stroke size 10 has a width of 19 pixels. The text tool allows users to select from their computer's font menu. Also, colors can be selected from a palette.

Paintbrush also includes a grid capability which shows each individual pixel on a grid. This option is particularly helpful to pixel artists.

The application includes an invert colors option, and a crop-selected-area function.

Like Microsoft Paint (except BMP), it can export all of the universal image formats such as PNG, JPEG, BMP, GIF, or TIFF (though like most applications, doesn't use application-specific formats like Photoshop's .psd or Paint Tool SAI).

Limitations

The application is purely a 2D bitmap editor, and as such has no vector capabilities. It is also not designed for photo manipulation, and therefore lacks advanced photo editing tools such as saturation, exposure, sharpness, or tint.

It also has a limitation in that the brush, spray can, and eraser will not draw any colors with opacity or transparency.

See also

 Comparison of raster graphics editors
 GIMP
 Pixelmator
 Seashore

References

External links
 
 

Free graphics software
Free software programmed in Objective-C
MacOS-only free software
Raster graphics editors
Software using the BSD license